Dynatochela is a genus of mites in the family Laelapidae.

Species
 Dynatochela primus Keegan, 1950

References

Laelapidae